Chomley Turner (1685–1757)  of Kirkleatham, Yorkshire was a British landowner and politician who sat in the House of Commons between 1715 and 1747.

Early life
 
Turner was baptized on 20 July 1685, the eldest son of Charles Turner of Kirkleatham and his wife Margaret Cholmley, daughter  of Sir William Cholmley, 2nd Baronet., of Whitby, Yorkshire. He matriculated at New College, Oxford in 1701. He was a wealthy country gentleman, and owned properties in Northallerton and along Tees side. He also had lead mining interests in the North Riding of Yorkshire. His great uncle Sir William Turner died in 1693 and bequeathed him a substantial amount of money to establish a Free School, which was built in 1709. He married  Jane Marwood, daughter of George Marwood of Little Busby, Yorkshire in 1709.

Career
Turner was returned as a Whig Member of Parliament for Northallerton at the 1715 general election.  He followed Robert Walpole into opposition in 1717, and voted against the Government in all recorded divisions. He did not stand at the  1722 general election. In 1725, he was High steward of York.

Turner was returned as MP for Yorkshire at a by-election on 1 February 1727 and followed it up being returned at the 1727 general election. In Parliament he took a very independent line. He spoke on the opposition side in a debate on foreign affairs on 5 February 1729,  and voted against the Government on the Hessians in 1730, the army in 1732, and the Excise Bill in 1733 but voted for the Government on the repeal of the Septennial Act in 1734. He said he would not stand at the next election, but changed his mind on receiving an invitation from the Whig county meeting at York. He was re-elected after a tough contest at the 1734 general election and voted with the Government on the navy estimates in February 1735, when he may have been influenced by  the petition which was raised against his return. He also voted for the Spanish convention in 1739. He refused again to stand in 1741 but when a by-election was called  he was adopted unanimously at another general Whig meeting and submitted to ‘the command of the gentlemen’. His only vote in this Parliament was for the Hanoverians in 1744. In 1747 he finally retired.

Later life
 Turner added other Grade I listed buildings to his estate, the most notable being the Turner Mausoleum, in memory of his son, and adjoining the Church of St Cuthbert. The mausoleum was built in 1739–40 by James Gibbs. It is of Baroque style and of an octagonal plan.  It is a single storey with a basement burial chamber. The exterior is heavily rusticated, with an unusually large area vermiculated. It contains the inscription, "This mausoleum was erected 1740 to the memory of Marwood William Turner Esquire the best of sons." Cholmley Turner also retained the architect James Gibbs for building of the chapel at the almshouses. After his retirement Turner received a secret service pension of £500 a year from Pelham, but this was not renewed when Newcastle succeeded to the Treasury.

Turner died 9 May 1757 but his children pre-deceased him.

References

1685 births
1757 deaths
Members of the Parliament of Great Britain for English constituencies
British MPs 1715–1722
British MPs 1722–1727
British MPs 1727–1734
British MPs 1734–1741
British MPs 1741–1747